Notes from the Frontier is a non-fiction book by American author Hugh Nissenson describing life on a kibbutz in northern Israel, published in 1968. The book documents the time Nissenson and his wife Marilyn spent on kibbutz Ma'ayan Baruch in the summers of 1965 and 1967.

Summary

The book is a first-person account of Nissenson's experiences living on the kibbutz, structured around the stories of several of its members:

Shlomo Wolfe, the kibbutz's electrician and officer in the IDF reserves.
Shlomo's wife Aliza, whose parents were killed in the Holocaust.
Aaron Stern, an immigrant from South Africa.

References

1968 non-fiction books
Books about the kibbutz